Lucas Costa da Silva (born 25 July 1994), better known as Lucas Tocantins, is a Brazilian professional footballer who plays as an attacking midfielder for Novorizontino.

Honours
Maringá
Taça FPF: 2015

Chapecoense
Campeonato Catarinense: 2020
Campeonato Brasileiro Série B: 2020

Remo
Copa Verde: 2021

References

External links

1999 births
Living people
Brazilian footballers
Association football midfielders
Botafogo Futebol Clube (SP) players
Ivinhema Futebol Clube players
Maringá Futebol Clube players
Club Athletico Paranaense players
FC Cascavel players
Rio Claro Futebol Clube players
Coritiba Foot Ball Club players
Associação Chapecoense de Futebol players
Clube do Remo players
Esporte Clube Santo André players
Grêmio Novorizontino players
Campeonato Brasileiro Série B players
Campeonato Brasileiro Série C players